Montville Township is one of the sixteen townships of Geauga County, Ohio, United States. As of the 2020 census the population was 1,938.

Geography
Located in the northeastern part of the county, it borders the following townships:
Thompson Township - north
Trumbull Township, Ashtabula County - northeast corner
Hartsgrove Township, Ashtabula County - east
Windsor Township, Ashtabula County - southeast corner
Huntsburg Township - south
Claridon Township - southwest corner
Hambden Township - west
LeRoy Township, Lake County - northwest corner.

No municipalities are located in Montville Township, although the unincorporated community of Montville lies at the center of the township.

The Cuyahoga River begins in Montville Township.

Name and history
Statewide, the only other Montville Township is located in Medina County.

The township includes a house that was once a stop on the Underground Railroad. The house still stands on the southeast corner of the intersection of U.S. Route 6 and State Route 528.The house is documented as the Whitney House. The basement still has the entrance used by slaves seeking freedom. The carpenter who built the home is buried at the Montville Cemetery and his name was Elihu Moore. The house dates back to the mid 1800s based on its architectural characteristics. The floor joist still have bark on them as this was all hand hewn.

Government
The township is governed by a three-member board of trustees, who are elected in November of odd-numbered years to a four-year term beginning on the following January 1. Two are elected in the year after the presidential election and one is elected in the year before it. There is also an elected township fiscal officer, who serves a four-year term beginning on April 1 of the year after the election, which is held in November of the year before the presidential election. Vacancies in the fiscal officership or on the board of trustees are filled by the remaining trustees.

Education
Montville Township formerly fell under the Ledgemont School District but was absorbed by the Berkshire School District in Burton.

References

External links
Montville Township official website
County website

Townships in Geauga County, Ohio
Populated places on the Underground Railroad
Townships in Ohio